The Cadaver Society is a secret society of students at Washington and Lee University in Lexington, Virginia, United States. The group's membership and organizational structure are unknown. Cadaver has been in continuous operation since its founding in 1957. The Cadavers have their symbol in many prominent places throughout the campus. In contrast with the non-secretive membership of the Sigma Society, the Cadaver Society is strictly anonymous.

Membership
Membership is speculated to consist of older students at the University. The criteria for membership remain largely unknown, but it has long been rumored that the society consists of pre-med majors with high grade point averages. Members have also been speculated to be leaders of Washington and Lee's athletic teams and fraternities.

The selection process is not well known, but the members pride themselves on donating large amounts of money to the University. In 1988, the society donated $150,000 to the renovation of the fraternity houses on campus.

Passageways
The society has long been rumored to have underground passageways spanning throughout the campus. It is rumored that members of the society use this as transportation to remain undetected by the rest of campus. One entrance to the tunnels has been speculated to be through a small door in the Leyburn Library.
In addition to the Leyburn entrance, there's also an alleged entrance in the basement of the Science Building through double doors that are usually locked. Another alleged entrance is through the manhole at the bottom of the hill near Leyburn Library.  There was another alleged entryway via a maintenance grate in front of the north entrance to Huntley Hall that has been locked. Allegedly when traversing the passages, there is graffiti from all manner of Washington and Lee Social Organizations visible along the tunnel and associated piping (ranging from the Cadaver and Sigma Societies to the Delta Sigma Theta sorority, Pi Kappa Alpha and Pi Kappa Phi fraternities and even university officials).

Activities
The society has been criticized for their secrecy and many of their activities which include running around dressed in all black and masks late at night as well as drawing their symbol all over campus. They have been known to run through the Sorority houses, talking in high voices and attempting to wake everyone in the houses. One place in particular where the Cadavers' logo can be consistently seen is on Wilson Field, frequently painted before large athletic games. Since the renovation of the field in 2008, and the replacement of grass with Field Turf, the Cadaver symbol has been drawn on the hill separating Alumni from Wilson Field. They also frequently refer to themselves as "A Friend of the University," presumably referring to their propensity to donate large sums of money to the school.

Scholarship and donations
A Cadaver Society scholarship was established in 1997. The scholarship is to be awarded every four years to an incoming freshman. Candidates are intended to be deserving students with strong character traits, academic achievement and an appreciation of the school’s values and traditions. The Cadaver Endowment was committed in 1981 to be designated as a residual fund in Cadaver's name to the school each year.

See also
Collegiate secret societies in North America

References

External links
Join Cadaver Society
Washington and Lee Journalism November 17, 2005
Timeline of Washington and Lee: Cadaver Society Formed
250th Anniversary of Washington and Lee, June 8, 2005
Donations to the University 2005
Matters of Record: Endowed Scholarships, The Cadaver Society Scholarship
Letters to the Editor, The Trident, Washington and Lee School Newspaper, September 18, 2002
College Prowler, Washington and Lee; The Inside Scoop

Collegiate secret societies
Student societies in the United States
Washington and Lee University
Student organizations established in 1957
1957 establishments in Virginia